Dinding River is the major river in Manjung district in Perak, Malaysia.

See also
 List of rivers of Malaysia

References

Rivers of Perak
Rivers of Malaysia